Dr. Károly Levitzky (1 May 1885, Dorgos – 23 August 1978, Budapest) was a Hungarian rower who competed at the 1908 Summer Olympics in London and at the 1912 Summer Olympics in Stockholm.  He won a bronze medal in single sculls in London. He was Jewish.

References

External links
 
 

1885 births
1978 deaths
People from Arad County
Hungarian male rowers
Olympic rowers of Hungary
Rowers at the 1908 Summer Olympics
Rowers at the 1912 Summer Olympics
Olympic bronze medalists for Hungary
Olympic medalists in rowing
Hungarian Jews
Jewish sportspeople
Medalists at the 1908 Summer Olympics